James Edson Berto, also known as Edson Berto (born July 5, 1983), is a Haitian-American professional mixed martial artist currently competing in the Featherweight division. A professional competitor since 2004, Berto has formerly competed for Bellator MMA, Strikeforce, and EliteXC. Berto is the brother of professional boxer Andre Berto.

Background
Originally from Haiti, Berto moved with his family and six younger siblings to Winter Haven, Florida at a young age. Berto began training in the martial arts when he was young, as his father, Diesuel, is a former professional boxer and mixed martial artist who competed at UFC 10. Also like his father, Berto competed in soccer at the professional level in Haiti.

Mixed martial arts record

|-
| Loss
| align=center| 17-12-1
| Rad Martinez
| Decision (unanimous)
| Bellator 114
| 
| align=center| 3
| align=center| 5:00
| West Valley City, Utah, United States
| Featherweight debut.
|-
| Loss
| align=center| 17-11-1
| Patricky Freire
| Decision (unanimous)
| Bellator 107
| 
| align=center| 3
| align=center| 5:00
| Thackerville, Oklahoma, United States
| 
|-
| Win
| align=center| 17-10-1
| Bruno Carvalho
| Submission (heel hook)
| Bellator 94
| 
| align=center| 1
| align=center| 1:27
| Tampa, Florida, United States
| 
|-
| Loss
| align=center| 16-10-1
| Abel Trujillo
| Submission (punches)
| CFA 6
| 
| align=center| 1
| align=center| 1:10
| Coral Gables, Florida, United States
| 
|-
| Loss
| align=center| 16-9-1
| Luis Palomino
| Decision (unanimous)
| W-1 MMA 7
| 
| align=center| 3
| align=center| 5:00
| Coral Gables, Florida, United States
|
|-
| Win
| align=center| 16-8-1
| Greg Loughran
| Submission (heel hook)
| AOF 7
| 
| align=center| 1
| align=center| 2:05
| Tampa, Florida, United States
| 
|-
| Loss
| align=center| 15-8-1
| Jason Ball
| Decision (unanimous)
| RFC 19
| 
| align=center| 5
| align=center| 5:00
| Tampa, Florida, United States
| 
|-
| Loss
| align=center| 15-7-1
| Jason Ball
| Decision (split)
| RFC 18
| 
| align=center| 3
| align=center| 5:00
| Tampa, Florida, United States
| 
|-
| Win
| align=center| 15-6-1
| Edson Diniz
| Decision (split)
| RFC 16
| 
| align=center| 3
| align=center| 5:00
| Tampa, Florida, United States
| 
|-
| Loss
| align=center| 14-6-1
| Conor Heun
| TKO (punches and elbows)
| EliteXC: Heat
| 
| align=center| 2
| align=center| 2:18
| Sunrise, Florida, United States
| 
|-
| Loss
| align=center| 14-5-1
| Yves Edwards
| KO (flying knee)
| EliteXC: Street Certified
| 
| align=center| 1
| align=center| 4:56
| Miami, Florida, United States
| 
|-
| Win
| align=center| 14-4-1
| Josh Odom
| Decision (unanimous)
| RFC 10
| 
| align=center| 3
| align=center| 5:00
| Tampa, Florida, United States
|
|-
| Win
| align=center| 13-4-1
| Juan Barrantes
| Decision (unanimous)
| RFC 9
| 
| align=center| 5
| align=center| 5:00
| Tampa, Florida, United States
| 
|-
| Loss
| align=center| 12-4-1
| K. J. Noons
| KO (knee)
| ShoXC: Elite Challenger Series
| 
| align=center| 3
| align=center| 0:45
| Santa Ynez, California, United States
|
|-
| Win
| align=center| 12-3-1
| Victor Valenzuela
| Submission (heel hook)
| Strikeforce: Shamrock vs. Baroni
| 
| align=center| 1
| align=center| 0:47
| San Jose, California, United States
| 
|-
| Win
| align=center| 11-3-1
| John Shackleford
| TKO (punches)
| EliteXC: Destiny
| 
| align=center| 2
| align=center| 2:27
| Southaven, Mississippi, United States
| 
|-
| Win
| align=center| 10-3-1
| Chris Mickle
| Submission (heel hook)
| RFC 7
| 
| align=center| 1
| align=center| 0:22
| Tampa, Florida, United States
| 
|-
| Win
| align=center| 9-3-1
| Mike Bogner
| Submission (heel hook)
| RFC 6
| 
| align=center| 1
| align=center| 2:56
| Tampa, Florida, United States
| 
|-
| Win
| align=center| 8-3-1
| Brandon McConkey
| TKO (punches)
| RFC 5
| 
| align=center| 2
| align=center| 4:25
| Tampa, Florida, United States
| 
|-
| Draw
| align=center| 7-3-1
| Matt Lee
| Draw
| AFC 16
| 
| align=center| 2
| align=center| 5:00
| Boca Raton, Florida, United States
| 
|-
| Win
| align=center| 7-3
| Peter Kalvijec
| Submission (heel hook)
| RFC 4
| 
| align=center| 1
| align=center| 1:08
| Tampa, Florida, United States
| 
|-
| Win
| align=center| 6-3
| Harris Norwood
| Submission (heel hook)
| RFC 3
| 
| align=center| 1
| align=center| 4:42
| Tampa, Florida, United States
| 
|-
| Loss
| align=center| 5-3
| Adriano Pereira
| Decision (split)
| AFC 13
| 
| align=center| 2
| align=center| 5:00
| Fort Lauderdale, Florida, United States
| 
|-
| Win
| align=center| 5-2
| Renat Myzabekov
| Submission (heel hook)
| RFC 2
| 
| align=center| 1
| align=center| 2:49
| Tampa, Florida, United States
| 
|-
| Win
| align=center| 4-2
| Marshall Blevins
| Submission (heel hook)
| RCF: Punishment
| 
| align=center| 2
| align=center| 1:40
| Biloxi, Mississippi, United States
| 
|-
| Loss
| align=center| 3-2
| Keith Wilson
| Decision (unanimous)
| RFC 1
| 
| align=center| 3
| align=center| 5:00
| Tampa, Florida, United States
| 
|-
| Loss
| align=center| 3-1
| Bryan Medlin
| Decision (majority)
| AFC 9
| 
| align=center| 2
| align=center| 5:00
| Fort Lauderdale, Florida, United States
| 
|-
| Win
| align=center| 3-0
| Chad Gauldin
| TKO (punches)
| AFC 8
| 
| align=center| 1
| align=center| 2:55
| Fort Lauderdale, Florida, United States
| 
|-
| Win
| align=center| 2-0
| Gregory Roberts
| TKO (strikes)
| Obaktagon Challenge 1
| 
| align=center| 3
| align=center| 1:15
| Jacksonville, Florida, United States
| 
|-
| Win
| align=center| 1-0
| Scott Johnson
| Submission (punches)
| AFC 7
| 
| align=center| 1
| align=center| 4:59
| Fort Lauderdale, Florida, United States
|

References

External links

1983 births
Living people
Lightweight mixed martial artists
Featherweight mixed martial artists
Mixed martial artists utilizing boxing
Mixed martial artists utilizing kickboxing
Mixed martial artists utilizing shoot wrestling
Haitian emigrants to the United States
American male mixed martial artists
American sportspeople of Haitian descent
Haitian male mixed martial artists